Peshgeer is one of the obsolete cotton piece goods produced in the Indian subcontinent. Peshgeer was a type of woven, printed material.

Mentions 
John Forbes Watson describes Peshgeer as cotton printed cloth made of English threads, used for petticoats for poor people. A sample in Fabric book infers its origin Shikarpore Sind.

Dimensions 
5 yards long and 32 inches broad.

Price 
Palle manufactured Peshgeer is recorded in the range of Rs 22-40/piece.

References 

Woven fabrics
Textile arts of Pakistan
Textile arts of India